Naser Manzuri (Azeri: Nasir Mənzuri; Persian: ناصر منظوری) is an Iranian novelist and linguist, born in 1953 in Mianeh.

He writes his novels in the Azerbaijani language. He vastly concentrates on Azeri mythical thoughts in his themes and combines with reality. However, he writes his linguistic theoreticals in three languages (Azerbaijani, Persian and English).

Bibliography

Novels
 Son Nağıl Son Efsane (The Last Tale, the Last Myth) 1990
 Qaraçuxa (pronounced: Qarachookha, name of some mythical character, in fact, it is the personification of protection and luck for any one.) 1994
 Avava (call for gathering, done by tapping the hand at the mouth on the last moony nights of summer Sonay) 2005

Scholarly work
In his linguistic researches he concentrates on deterministic concepts. His books are (written in three languages):
 نظام چهار بعدی زبان (Four-dimensional System of Language) 2002
 Deterministically Structuring Concepts 2003
 Dil ve Ayın Düşünce (Language and Mythical Thought) 2007
 آشوبی شدگی در شعر شهريار-1 (Oral Tablets-1) (Sheriyar’s [Azeri poet] Poetry going Chaotic -1) 2009
 آشوبی شدگی در شعر شهريار -2 (Oral Tablets-2) (Sheriyar’s [Azeri poet] Poetry going Chaotic -2) 2009
 زايش ادبيات (Oral Tablets-4) (Birth of Literature) 2011
 مفهوم صدا (Oral Tablets-5) (Concepts with the Sounds) 2011
 ساختار مفهومی فعل (Oral Tablets-6) (Conceptual Structuring of Verbs) 2012
 نظام فراجمله ای در زبان ترکی (Oral Tablets-7) (Ultra-sentential System in Turkish Language) 2012
  ٤ باى، ٤ فصل (Oral Tablets 8) (4 BAYs, 4 Seasons) 2014
  اساطیر یونانی در سیاه چاله زبان-فکر (Oral Tablets 9) (Greek Myths in the Black Hole of Language-thought) 2015
 مفهوم "مونث" در زبان-فکر (Oral Tablets 10) ("Femininity" as Conceptualized in Language-thought) 2015
 آذ (Oral Tablets 11) (Az) 2017

References 

Scrutiny over Naser Manzuri's AVAVA Novel, Masters Thesis, (Nasır Menzuri’nin AVAVA ROMANI ÜZERİNE BİR İNCELEME), Sedef Ahenpençe, yüksek lisans tezi, CELAL BAYAR ÜNİ. SOSYAL BİLİMLER ENS. YENİ TÜRK EDEBİYATI ANABİLİM DALI, 2010
Azərbaycan (Official Journal of Azerbaijan Writers) (9), 2005
Alatoran "Azad Yazarlar Ocağı" (Journal of Free Writers) (12) & (13), 2008
Writer and Scientist, "Ədəbiyyat Qəzeti" (Literature Journal), No 29 (4884), Baku, 2013
Cənubi Azərbaycan Ədəbiyyatı Tarıxı XX əsr (South Azerbaijan Literature History XX era), II Vol., p. 617, Azerbaijan National Academia of Sciences, 2013
Nasır Menzuri Hayatı, Edebi Kişiliyi və Karaçuha Romanı, (Nazer Manzuri's Life, Literary Personality and Qarachookha Novel), Nazanin Zolfaghari, Master Thesis, T.C., Ege Uni., Social Sciences Institute, Literature of Turk World ABD, 2013

External links 

Azerbaijani-language writers
1953 births
Living people
Linguists from Iran
People from Mianeh
Iranian grammarians